Dennis Haskins (born November 18, 1950) is an American actor known for his role as Principal Richard Belding in the teen sitcom Saved by the Bell, which ran from 1989 to 1993 on NBC. He then went on to star in Saved by the Bell: The New Class, which aired from 1993 to 2000. He also portrayed the role as a regular in Good Morning, Miss Bliss.

Early life
He was born in Chattanooga, Tennessee. Haskins is an alumnus of Our Lady of Perpetual Help as well as Notre Dame High School in Chattanooga and of the University of Tennessee at Chattanooga. He played basketball at UTC after failing to make the team at the University of Tennessee. He was also a member of the cheerleading squad. Haskins is a member of the Kappa Sigma fraternity. Dennis Haskins currently splits his time between Los Angeles and Winthrop, Massachusetts.

Before breaking into acting, Haskins was a contestant on the TV game shows Press Your Luck and Scrabble.

Career

Television and film
Before his role on Saved by the Bell, Haskins appeared in several episodes of The Dukes of Hazzard in different roles. In the pilot episode, he plays a Boar's Nest patron whom Daisy thrashes after he attempts to grope her while she's working as a waitress.

Haskins, who auditioned seven times for the role of Mr. Belding, first appeared as the character in 1988's Good Morning, Miss Bliss on the Disney Channel. After a year the show was retooled as Saved by the Bell on NBC, with Haskins being the only adult member of the regular cast. Known for the catchphrase "Hey, hey, hey, what is going on here?", he continued the role on the spinoff Saved by the Bell: The New Class until 2000. He had a brief cameo as himself in the 2006 film Boys & Girls Guide To Getting Down.

As a guest on the March 4, 2010 episode of Late Night with Jimmy Fallon, Haskins boasted he was capable of bench pressing 150 pounds as a senior member of Notre Dame men's varsity basketball team.

On February 4, 2015, Haskins reunited with Mark-Paul Gosselaar, Elizabeth Berkley, Mario Lopez and Tiffani Thiessen on The Tonight Show Starring Jimmy Fallon where they appeared in a Saved by the Bell sketch with Fallon.

He appeared in the 2014 film A Million Ways to Die in the West as a snake oil salesman at the fair.

In recent years, he has been lobbying to become a cast member on ABC's Dancing With The Stars.

Music and other media
On August 31, 2009, Haskins released his first music album called "Karaoke with Your Favorite Principal Dennis." On the album, he sings everything from "Piano Man" to "Mustang Sally", the latter being a duet with Hulk Hogan's daughter Brooke Hogan. The CD was recorded in the summer of 2009 at Mikron Studios in South Pittsburg, Tennessee, with Mike Headrick. Cody McCarver produced the project, and Mike Yarworth financed it. More recently, in 2010, Haskins appeared in the video for "See You in Shell" by experimental metalcore band Iwrestledabearonce, which parodied Saved by the Bell and films by John Hughes.

Haskins is also a fan of professional wrestling and WWE. He has appeared in multiple episodes of Z! True Long Island Story, a YouTube series by WWE professional wrestler Zack Ryder. He is also friends with former Los Angeles Dodgers pitching coach Rick Honeycutt.

On July 14, 2016, Haskins performed on stage with the 90s themed band, Saved by the 90s, in Toledo, Ohio at a Toledo Mud Hens minor league baseball game.

Haskins appears in the music video for Dirty Heads' "Vacation". He is seen in an empty high school lip syncing to the entire track. 

Haskins also appears in the music video for Khalid's "Young Dumb & Broke" where he plays a principal making an end of year announcement over the school's intercom.

Filmography
The Dukes of Hazzard (1979–1985) (TV series)...Elmo Smith / Gate Guard (uncredited) / Charlie Watkins / Moss
Magnum PI: Autumn Warrior (1986) (TV series)...Del Haynes 
Good Morning, Miss Bliss (1987) (TV series)... Mr. Richard Belding
Hiroshima Maiden (1988) (TV)... Hal Latimer
Saved by the Bell (1989) (TV series)... Principal Richard Belding
The Image (1990) (TV)... Steven Fish
Eyewitness to Murder (1991)... Dr. Baldwin
Saved by the Bell: Hawaiian Style (1992) (TV)... Mr. Richard Belding
Saved by the Bell: The College Years (1993) (TV series, guest)... Mr. Richard Belding
Saved by the Bell: The New Class (1993) (TV series)... Principal Richard Belding
Saved by the Bell: Wedding in Las Vegas (1994) (TV)... Mr. Richard Belding
Figure It Out: Family Style (1998)... Himself (panelist)
The Boy with the X-Ray Eyes (1999)... Boyd Russell
The Practice (2001) Psychiatrist 
18 (2001)... Laura's Dad
The West Wing "Bartlet for America" (2001)... C.E.O. Donor #2
Max Keeble's Big Move (2001)... Mr. Kohls 
The Stoneman (2002)... Dean Hendricks
An Ordinary Killer (2002)... Ronald Smith
Dismembered (2003)
Going Down (2003)... Uncle Frank
Red Water (2003) (TV)... Captain Dale Landry
Tangy Guacamole (2003)... Toss Honeycut
7th Heaven: "Stand Up" (2003)... Traffic Officer
An Ordinary Killer (2004)... Ronald Smith
Dead End Road (2004)... Mr. Makepiece
JAG (2004) (TV Series)... Airport Security S-1
It's Always Sunny in Philadelphia (2005)... Coach Murray
Wild Michigan (2005)... Sheriff Folgar
The Treasure of Painted Forest (2005)... Sheriff Thomas
The Boys & Girls Guide to Getting Down (2006)... Himself
Revamped (2007) (V) ... Satanist #2
Sweep The Leg (2007)... Pizza Store owner/dad
Ratko: The Dictator's Son (2008) ... Dean Sitlong
Ocean of Pearls (2008) ... Dr. Shultz
Robot Chicken (TV series) (V) ... Jigsaw / Mr. Belding
Private High Musical (2008)... Mr. Johnson
Stacy's Mom (2008) ... Professor Wood
Creative Differences (2008) ... Tom
The Legend of Awesomest Maximus (2008) ... Father Jay
Acting School Academy (Web Series) (2009)... Martin DeWitt
Men Of A Certain Age (TV Series) (2010)... Terry's Landlord
See You In Shell, Music Video by iwrestledabearonce (2010)
Neighborhood Watch (Web Series) (2010)... Principal Gibbous
Z! True Long Island Story (Web Series) (2011–2013)... Himself/Mr. Belding
Victorious (TV Series) (2012)... Mr. Belding
Mad Men (TV Series) (2012)... Cool Whip Test kitchen scientist
How I Met Your Mother (TV Series) (2012)... Judge #2
The JBL and Cole Show (Web Series) (2013)... Himself
A Million Ways to Die in the West (2014) ... Snake Oil Salesman
New Girl (2014) ... Santa
Up on the Wooftop (2015)... Santa Claus
Hot in Cleveland (2015)... Reverend Bower
The Tonight Show (2015)... Mr. Richard Belding
Holly, Jingles and Clyde (2017) ... Santa Claus
Bennett's Song (2018)...Gpa Sam Bennett
Abstruse (2019)...Senator Stevens
Enigma (2019)...Bob Jenkins
Clemency (2019)... Mr. Collins
A Bennett Song Holiday (2020)...Gpa Sam Bennett

Awards
Haskins was honored with The University of Tennessee at Chattanooga's Most Distinguished Alumni of 2000 award and has a regional high school academic decathlon named after him, The Dennis Haskins Open, now in its eleventh year.

References

External links
 
 
 Dennis Haskins at The New York Times
 2003 Interview with Dennis Haskins
 Review of a college performance by Haskins.
 Dennis Haskins' karaoke album at Lucky Voice Blog

1950 births
20th-century American male actors
21st-century American male actors
American male film actors
American male television actors
Living people
People from Chattanooga, Tennessee
Male actors from Tennessee